Raptus is the Latin for "seized", from rapere "to seize". In Roman law the term covered many crimes of property, and women were considered property.

It may refer to:
any literal seizure
confiscation
robbery
kidnapping
raptio, i.e. the abduction of women, also known as Frauenraub; these are the "rapes of Zeus".
the term for bride kidnapping in Catholic canon law
rape in medieval English law
medical
seizure
epileptic seizure
stroke
convulsion
focal seizure
in religion, spirituality and subjective experience
rapture, a Protestant belief about the End Times and the transport of redeemed souls
status raptus, religious ecstasy
 being "carried away" or "transported", being in good spirits, see Ecstasy (emotion)
out-of-body experience

See also
Rape
History of rape
Raptor, certain birds of prey and dinosaurs, and the human creations named after them (military equipment, sporting teams, etc.)
the artistic and poetic concept of the sublime, especially in Romantic texts, inspired rapture.
the literary critic Longinus and his essay "On the Sublime".
the protagonist in Dario Fo's play Accidental Death of an Anarchist died in raptus.

Latin words and phrases